A collodion bag is a membrane used to filter or concentrate substances, often proteins, using pressure. It usually takes the form of a small finger shaped receptacle hooked up to a positive pressure pump.  The bag has a characteristic pore size that allows small particles, like water or unbound ions, to flow out while retaining larger particles in the bag.

References

Further reading
Modern Techniques in Cytopathology
Can't Live Without it: The Story of Hemoglobin in Sickness and in Health
Colloidion bag - Google Search

Microbiology equipment